Scott McCarthy (born ) is a Canadian male weightlifter, competing in the 77 kg category and representing Canada at international competitions. He competed at world championships, most recently at the 1999 World Weightlifting Championships.

Major results

References

1972 births
Living people
Canadian male weightlifters
Place of birth missing (living people)
Weightlifters at the 2002 Commonwealth Games
Commonwealth Games medallists in weightlifting
Commonwealth Games bronze medallists for Canada
20th-century Canadian people
21st-century Canadian people
Medallists at the 2002 Commonwealth Games